Quartz Composer is a node-based visual programming language provided as part of the Xcode development environment in macOS for processing and rendering graphical data.

Quartz Composer uses OpenGL (including GLSL), OpenCL (only in Mac OS X Snow Leopard and later), Core Image, Core Video, JavaScript, and other technologies to create an API and a developer tool around a simple visual programming paradigm. Apple has embedded Quartz technologies deeply into the operating system. Compositions created in Quartz Composer can be played standalone in any QuickTime-aware application (although only on Mac OS X Tiger and later), as a system Screen Saver, as an iTunes Visualizer, from inside the Quartz Composer application, or can be embedded into a Cocoa or Carbon application via supplied user interface widgets. While Quartz Composer is included with the iPhone SDK,  there is no way of running Quartz Compositions on iOS devices. Starting in macOS Catalina, the Quartz Composer framework has been deprecated, although it is still present for compatibility.

Patches

Quartz programming through Quartz Composer works by implementing and connecting patches. Similar to routines in traditional programming languages, patches are base processing units. They execute and produce a result. For better performance, patch execution follows a lazy evaluation approach, meaning that patches are only executed when their output is needed. There are three types of patches: Consumers, Processors, and External Input patches that can receive and output mouse clicks, scrolls, and movements; MIDI and audio; keyboard; or other movements. A collection of patches can be melded into one, called a macro. Macros can be nested and their subroutines also edited.

To control the order of rendering, each renderer is assigned a layer, indicated in its upper-right corner.  Layers are rendered sequentially, lowest to highest.  Renderers can be enabled or disabled, essentially turning on or off that particular layer.  Turning off unused layers often results in better performance, since fewer upstream patches need to be evaluated.

Some patches can have subpatches, which allows for global parameter changes to just the included subpatches.  This is useful for lighting, 3D transformation, and GLSL shaders, among other things.  Subpatch support is indicated by square corners on a patch, rather than the typical rounded corners.

With Version 3.0, it became possible to turn compositions into Virtual Patches.  These allow the user to reuse functionality without having to store duplicate copies in each composition.  The Quartz Composer Editor allows the user to save a "flattened" copy (with the virtual patches fully expanded inside), for easy distribution.  Version 4.0 extended this functionality even more, and automatically includes "flattened" copies of virtual patches for use as a fallback if the desired virtual patch isn't installed on the host system.  This greatly simplifies composition distribution.

Network functionality was greatly improved with the release of Leopard.  It became possible to transmit data and synchronize over a network interface, and it also added support for Open Sound Control transmission and reception.

Plugins

Also new in Version 3.0 was the possibility to write custom patch plugins, using an Xcode template, and the notion of a "safe mode", where plugins and other unsafe patches fail to load.  This prevents malicious compositions from performing dangerous or insecure operations.  Custom patches using Apple's Xcode template are always considered unsafe.

It was possible to develop custom patch plugins for Version 2.0, but the API was undocumented and private, and was never supported by Apple. Eventually, templates were released to simplify this procedure.

Hidden options
In the Quartz Composer editor, holding the option key while selecting "Preferences..." from the menu adds 3 additional tabs of options for the user to configure.  These options include System settings, Editor settings, and QuickTime integration settings.  Notable options include expanded tooltips, software rendering, and uncapped framerate rendering.  Multisample antialiasing (MSAA) was added as a hidden option in version 4.0, allowing for antialiasing inside the QC Editor, though it only works on GPU's that support MSAA.

Native datatypes
Data inside QC can be one of the following types:
 Boolean - a boolean value, 0 or 1
 Index - a positive integer between 0 and 2147483647
 Number - a double precision floating point number
 String - a unicode string
 Color - an RGBA or CMYK quartet, or a Grayscale value
 Image - a 2D image of arbitrary (possibly infinite) dimensions
 Structure - a named or ordered collection of objects, including nested structures
 Virtual - any of the above

Two additional types were introduced in version 4.0:
 Mesh - a collection of vertices, and per-vertex normals, texture coordinates, and colors in 3-space
 Interaction - a valueless type used to associate user input with user-interactive elements of the composition

Type conversion
Data can usually be converted to other types transparently.  In Quartz Composer 3.0, the connections between patches change color to indicate conversions that are taking place.  Yellow connections mean no conversion is taking place, Orange indicates a possible loss of data from conversion (Number to Index), and Red indicates a severe conversion;  Image to Boolean, for example.

Compositions
Quartz Composer documents are called Compositions. Compositions are Binary Property Lists (though XML versions are also supported) with a filename extension .qtz, and a com.apple.quartz-composer-composition UTI. Patches, their connections, and their input port states are saved in the composition file. Images can be stored inside a composition as well, making for self-contained compositions with embedded graphics. By dragging a movie file into the Quartz Composer editor, a reference to the movie file is created, providing a changing image that can be connected to a renderer.

Compositions also store metadata such as composition author, copyright, and description.  The user can also add arbitrary metadata items, if desired.

Many image formats are supported, including JPEG, JPEG2000, GIF, PNG, TIFF, TGA, OpenEXR, BMP, ICO, PDF, PICT, ICNS, and some raw digital camera types. Images are maintained in their native form for as long as possible before rasterizing for display. This means that Quartz Composer will keep vector images as vectors when cropping, scaling, rotating, or translating which allows it to work with very large logical image dimensions without consuming large amounts of memory or processing time. Such functionality is most apparent when working with text-based images, or PDFs.

Version 3.0 added the ability to add annotations to areas of the composition, called notes.  These notes parallel comments in other programming languages.  Notes can be yellow, red, green, blue, or gray, and can overlap other notes.

Composition protocols
In Version 3.0, the concept of Composition Protocols was introduced.  Protocols provide a template of required and optional inputs and outputs to qualify conforming compositions for various purposes.  The following protocols are available by default:
 Graphic Animation - These don't have required inputs or outputs, but are required to render to the screen.  Graphic Animations are useful for animated backgrounds in applications such as Keynote.
 Image Filter - Modifies an image using filters.  No renderers are allowed in Image Filters, unless they are inside of a Render In Image environment.
 Graphic Transition - Generates a transition from a source image to a destination image over a fixed time interval.
 RSS Visualizer - Parses and Displays an RSS Feed.
 Screen Saver - Integrates with Finder for animated screen savers.
 Music Visualizer - Integrates with iTunes for audio visualization.

There is an additional protocol that Apple uses in their private API:
Photo Visualizer - Receives an image list, provides information about total image count and currently displayed image.

One new protocol was added in version 4.0:
 Mesh Filter - deforms an input mesh.

There is no officially supported way to add additional protocols to Quartz Composer. However, there are some undocumented methods that may make this possible in the future.

Composition runtimes
In addition to protocols, compositions can also conform to different runtimes where Quartz Composer is available.  In Leopard, there are runtimes for Tiger (32-bit), as well as 32-bit and 64-bit versions of the Leopard Quartz Composer runtime.  The editor can also indicate used patches that are unsafe, or unavailable in Tiger to aid in making compatible compositions.

Composition repository
A System-wide Composition Repository is available as of Version 3.0. This allows applications to share and make use of common compositions for effects and processing. It is also possible for applications to query the repository for compositions that match certain criteria, such as protocol conformance.

The Repository is spread across 3 file system locations:
 /System/Library/Compositions - core system compositions (the user typically doesn't modify these)
 /Library/Compositions - compositions available for all users
 /Users/username/Library/Compositions - compositions available for only this user

Adding compositions to the repository is as simple as adding the composition file to one of these locations.

Comparing compositions
It became possible to compare compositions in Quartz Composer 3.0.  This feature allows the user to compare inputs, rendered output, and graph appearance of any two compositions.

Related software

Quartz Composer Visualizer
A developer tool called Quartz Composer Visualizer was released with Quartz Composer 3.0 that allows compositions to be rendered across multiple screens on a single machine, or even spanned across several machines and displays.

Automator support
Support for some Automator actions was added with the release of Leopard.
 Apply Quartz Composition Filter to Image Files
 Convert Quartz Compositions to QuickTime Movies
 Render Quartz Compositions to Image Files

History

Pierre-Olivier Latour originally developed the predecessor to Quartz Composer under the name PixelShox Studio.

References

External links

Books 
Quartz Composer Book in Japanese
Learning Quartz Composer Book & DVD in English

Tutorials and documentation
Quartz Composer Programming Guide from Apple
Quartz Composer tutorials
Quartz Composer wiki
kineme.net QC Wiki
quartzcomposer.com (unofficial website)
George Toledo's Programming and Design Blog
Rob Duarte's 2015 series of Quartz Composer tutorial videos
cybero's Quartz Composer JavaScript guide, blog & other Quartz Composer tutorials
Quartz Composer interaction design tutorials

Mailing list
Mailing List
Mailing List Archives
Kineme Quartz Composer, Patches & Plugins forum

Compositions
QuartzCompositions.com Forum and Composition Repository
kineme.net Composition Repository
ZUGAKOUSAKU
Quartz Composer Composition Directory
 GLSL, CoreImage & OpenCL Quartz Composer files from toneburst on machinesdontcare
George Toledo's Programming and Design Blog

Custom patches / plugins
vade’s v002 plugins & effects
Kineme QC Patches
Google Quartz Composer Patches
Qtzlcodex Quartz Composer Custom Patches
_1024 plugins by Francois Wunschel
Minuek's Quartz Composer Patches
Paolo Manna QC LuaPlugin
Open Emu for QC
Open Frameworks for QC
Tom Butterworth plugins
CoGe plugins by Tamas Nagy
George Toledo's Programming and Design Blog ( a variety of official and non-official api plugins and Xcode projects )
I Love QC New Site dedicated to learning Quartz Composer, making files and supporting the Pearson Education book Learning Quartz Composer
jQC by QCDesigners, an interaction design framework for Quartz Composer
Facebook Origami, a free design prototyping toolkit for Quartz Composer

Images and videos
Quartz Composer on Flickr
Quartz Composer on Vimeo

Visual programming languages
MacOS development